The 2001–02 Czech 1.liga season was the ninth season of the Czech 1.liga, the second level of ice hockey in the Czech Republic. 14 teams participated in the league, and HC Bili Tygri Liberec won the championship.

Regular season

Playoffs

Quarterfinals 
 HC Bílí Tygři Liberec – SK Kadaň 4:1 (6:3, 4:3, 2:6, 3:1:, 3:0)
 SK Horácká Slavia Třebíč – HC Slezan Opava 4:1 (3:1, 6:1, 1:3, 3:2, 4:3)
 HC Dukla Jihlava – HC Slovan Ústí nad Labem 4:2 (4:1, 2:4, 2:3, 3:1, 2:1 P, 3:2)
 KLH Chomutov – HC Prostějov 4:2 (1:4, 4:5 SN, 2:0, 2:1 P, 6:3, 2:1)

Semifinals 
 HC Bílí Tygři Liberec – KLH Chomutov 3:0 (8:1, 8:1, 4:2)
 SK Horácká Slavia Třebíč – HC Dukla Jihlava 0:3 (3:4, 1:3, 2:5)

Final 
 HC Bílí Tygři Liberec – HC Dukla Jihlava 3:1 (2:1, 2:3 P, 2:1, 3:2)

Qualification

Relegation

External links
 Season on hockeyarchives.info

2001–02 in Czech ice hockey
Czech
Czech 1. Liga seasons